Julia Chan, also known as Julia Taylor Ross, is an English actress and presenter. She is best known for her roles as Sophia in the horror film Silent House (2011), Dr. Maggie Lin in the CTV series Saving Hope (2012–2017), the co-host of the first two seasons of The Great Canadian Baking Show (2017–2019), and Pepper Smith in The CW series Katy Keene (2020).

Early life and education
Chan was born and raised in Cheshire. Chan's father, Roy Chan, is a Hong Kong–based solicitor of Chinese heritage; her mother, Lorna, is a Canadian ballerina. She was raised in Cheshire and attended University College, in London, England, and then attended Harvard, in Cambridge, Massachusetts. While there, she frequently acted at the nearby American Repertory Theater. She graduated with a BA in History of Art and Architecture. She received her master's degree from New York's New School of Drama in 2010.

Career
While still at graduate school, Chan gained a role in the Global Television Network's Rookie Blue (2010) (airing in the United States on ABC). From 2011 to 2017 Chan played regular series character Dr. Maggie Lin for five seasons on CTV's Saving Hope, which was carried in the U.S. by NBC.  She appeared in the role of Sophia in Silent House, a 2011 American horror film directed by Chris Kentis and Laura Lau, and the following year the romantic comedy film Missed Connections.

Chan has appeared in two Canadian television programs, miniseries Bloodletting & Miraculous Cures and series Republic of Doyle. In 2015, Chan appeared in the movie, Ava's Possessions. Chan has also made guest appearances in episodes of Gotham (2016) and Schitt's Creek (2017).

She hosted The Great Canadian Baking Show with Dan Levy, which premiered November 1, 2017, on CBC.  Chan returned as host for the second season in 2018, but neither she nor Levy returned for the show's third season.

On February 21, 2019, it was announced that she had landed the role of Pepper Smith in The CW's Katy Keene, a spin-off series of Riverdale which started airing in 2020.  She appears alongside Lucy Hale, Ashleigh Murray, and Jonny Beauchamp.
In 2021, Chan appeared in the stage play 2:22 A Ghost Story. She appeared in Archive 81 which premiered on Netflix January 14, 2022.

Personal life
Chan married Erik Ratensperger in 2011 and they divorced in 2019.

Filmography

Film

Television / Web

References

External links
 

1983 births
Canadian film actresses
Harvard University alumni
Living people
Canadian television hosts
Canadian television actresses
British people of Canadian descent
British actresses of Chinese descent
Alumni of University College London
The New School alumni
Canadian women television hosts
Actors from Cheshire
English people of Canadian descent